Scarinish is the main village on the island of Tiree, in the Inner Hebrides of Scotland. It is located on the south coast of the island, between Hynish Bay to the southwest and Gott Bay to the northeast. The harbour was built in 1771. In 1961 it had a population of 103.

The village has the only bank on the island (a branch of the Royal Bank of Scotland), a Co-op grocery store, a hotel, and a Post Office.

The Tiree ferry terminal is located there, with a ferry service that runs to Oban on the Scottish mainland. A ferry shelter completed in March 2003 won the RIAS Andrew Doolan Best Building in Scotland Award that year.

References

External links

Villages on Tiree